Kuromajo-san ga Tōru!! is an anime television series by Shin-Ei Animation based on the series of children's novels written by Hiroshi Ishizaki and illustrated by Kaori Fujita. The series follows Chiyoko "Choco" Kurotori, a girl who inadvertently summons a black witch named Gyubid and ends up becoming her magical apprentice. The series began airing on NHK Educational TV from April 4, 2012.

Episode list

Season 2

Kuromajo-san ga Toru!!